Annabel Walker is an English author, who grew up in South-West Devon. She read English and History at Bristol University and subsequently became a journalist working for the national press in London. Her first book, Kensington and Chelsea: A Social and Architectural History, was published by John Murray in 1987.  In 1995, her biography of the explorer Aurel Stein (subsequently translated and published in Chinese)  was reviewed in the TLS,  The Spectator, as well as academic journals.

She is also the author of England from the Air. New York: H.N. Abrams, 1989.

References

English biographers
Year of birth missing (living people)
Living people
Alumni of the University of Bristol
English women non-fiction writers
Women biographers